The 2015 Southeastern Conference men's basketball tournament was the postseason men's basketball tournament for the Southeastern Conference held at Bridgestone Arena in Nashville, Tennessee from March 11–15, 2015. The tournament consisted of five rounds and included all 14 SEC teams. Seeds 5 through 10 will receive a first-round bye, and the top four seeds will receive a "double bye" through the first round and second round. All games of the tournament were televised by the networks of ESPN, with the first three rounds on the SEC Network.

Seeds

Schedule

Bracket

Game statistics

First round

Second round

Quarterfinals

Semifinals

Championship game

See also
 2015 SEC women's basketball tournament

References

2014–15 Southeastern Conference men's basketball season
SEC men's basketball tournament
Basketball competitions in Nashville, Tennessee
2015 in sports in Tennessee
College sports tournaments in Tennessee
21st century in Nashville, Tennessee